Club Bàsquet Cornellà is a professional basketball team based in Cornellà de Llobregat, Catalonia. The team currently plays inLEB Plata.

Since the 1990s until 2010, CB Cornellà worked as farm team of FC Barcelona. After the 2009–10 season, the team was relegated to LEB Plata, but due to financial problems and to finish the agreement with FC Barcelona, CB Cornellà decided to join LEB Plata, the fourth tier.

Season by season

Trophies and awards

Trophies
2nd division championships: (1)
1ª División B: (1) 1993
3rd division championships: (2)
Liga EBA: (1) 2000
LEB Plata: (1) 2001

Current roster

External links
Official website

Catalan basketball teams
Former LEB Oro teams
Liga EBA teams
Former LEB Plata teams
Cornellà de Llobregat